John Stark (1728–1822) was an American major general during the American Revolution.

John Stark may also refer to:

John Stark (judge) (1798–?), Scottish lawyer and Queen's Advocate of Ceylon
John Stark (swimmer) (born 1948), Australian Olympic swimmer
John Stark (police officer) (c. 1865–1940), British police officer
John Stillwell Stark (1841–1927), American music publisher
John Stark (printer) (1779-1849), Scottish printer, author and naturalist
John Stark (actor), Canadian theatre actor

See also
Johnny Stark (1922–1989), French impresario
Jonathan Stark (disambiguation)
John Starks (disambiguation)
Eric John Stark, a character created by the science fiction author Leigh Brackett